Paphiopedilum hirsutissimum is a species of orchid ranging from Assam to southern China.

hirsutissimum